Yaroslava Yosypivna Stetsko (14 May 1920 – 12 March 2003), also popularly known as Slava Stetsko, was a Ukrainian politician and a World War II veteran.

Born Anna Yevheniia Muzyka in Romanówka near Ternopil in Poland, she became a member of the Organization of Ukrainian Nationalists (OUN) in 1938. When a schism occurred within the OUN in 1940, Stetsko went with the wing of the OUN-B led by Stepan Bandera. During World War II, she served as an orderly and nurse in the Ukrainian Insurgent Army. In 1943 Stesko was arrested by Germans in Lwów. She remained in Germany as an émigré after her release in 1944.

After the war, she married Yaroslav Stetsko in Munich, and became a member of the central committee of the Anti-Bolshevik Bloc of Nations (ABN) and its chairman after the death of her husband in 1986. At that time she also became an executive member of the World Anti-Communist League.

Slava Stetsko returned to Ukraine in July 1991. The following year, she formed and became a chairman of the Congress of Ukrainian Nationalists (CUN), the political party that was established in Ukraine on the basis of the Organization of Ukrainian Nationalists (OUN), which she also led for the last decade.

She died in Munich, after a short illness, and was buried at Baikove Cemetery in Kyiv.

References

External links

Slava Stetsko biography on Ukrainian OUN-UPA history site

1920 births
2003 deaths
People from Ternopil Oblast
Members of the Ukrainian Greek Catholic Church
Organization of Ukrainian Nationalists politicians
Congress of Ukrainian Nationalists politicians
Second convocation members of the Verkhovna Rada
Third convocation members of the Verkhovna Rada
Fourth convocation members of the Verkhovna Rada
Ukrainian nationalists
Ukrainian women in World War II
Ukrainian refugees
Naturalized citizens of Ukraine
Lviv Polytechnic alumni
Burials at Baikove Cemetery
20th-century Ukrainian women politicians
Soviet women in World War II
Soviet expatriates in Germany
Women members of the Verkhovna Rada